The Witcher is a fantasy series of short stories and novels by Polish writer Andrzej Sapkowski.

The Witcher may also refer to other works based on the stories by Andrzej Sapkowski:

 The Witcher (TV series), a 2019 American fantasy television series
 The Witcher (video game series), an action role-playing game series beginning in 2007
 The Witcher (video game), 2007
 The Witcher 2: Assassins of Kings, 2011
 The Witcher 3: Wild Hunt, 2015
 The Witcher, alternative English title of the Polish film, The Hexer, 2001
 The Witcher, alternative English title of the Polish television series, The Hexer, 2002
 "The Witcher", a 1986 short story later included in the short story collection The Last Wish, 1993
 The Witcher (Prószyński i S-ka), 1993–1995, a comic book series, written by Maciej Parowski and illustrated by Bogusław Polch
 The Witcher (Dark Horse Comics), 2014–present

See also
 The Witcher of Grand Kiev, a cyberpunk-fantasy parody of Andrzej Sapkowski's the Witcher, written by a Russian author Vladimir Vasilyev
 Witcher (disambiguation)